Sayegh is an Arabic surname which means goldsmith. Notable people with the surname include:

Abdul Nasser Al-Sayegh (born 1959), Kuwaiti fencer
Adnan Al-Sayegh (born 1955), Iraqi singer
Ahmad Ali Al Sayegh (born 1962), Emirati businessman and CEO of Dolphin Energy
Bashar Al-Sayegh (born 1977), Kuwaiti journalist and politician
Daud as-Sayegh, Iraqi communist politician
Fayez Sayegh, Palestinian-American academic
Fayez Sayegh (1922–1980), Palestinian-American academic and civil servant
Faisal Al Sayegh, Lebanese Druze politician
Hani al-Sayegh, Saudi citizen, and alleged member of Hezbollah Al-Hejaz
Jean Sayegh (born 1981), Canadian water polo player
Jim Sayegh, American television director
Joe Sayegh, (1884–1946) Syrian born New Zealand politician and businessman
Maximos IV Sayegh (1878–1967), Syrian cardinal
May Sayegh (1940–2023), Palestinian poet, feminist, political activist and writer
Nader Sayegh, Jordanian-American politician, attorney, and educator
Patricio Sayegh (born 1967), Argentine professional association footballer
Percy Sayegh (born 1965), Lebanese swimmer 
Salim Sayegh, Lebanese academic and politician
Salim Sayegh (Catholic bishop) (born 1935), Patriarchal Vicar for Jordan in the Latin Patriarch of Jerusalem
Tony Sayegh, United States Assistant Secretary of the Treasury for Public Affairs